Lipan Independent School District is a public school district based in Lipan, Texas, United States.

Located in Hood County, portions of the district extend into Erath, Palo Pinto, and Parker counties.

Lipan ISD has one school that serves students in grades pre-kindergarten through twelve.

In 2009, the school district was rated "recognized" by the Texas Education Agency.

Students

Academics

Students in Lipan match or outperform local region and statewide averages on standardized tests.  In 2018-2019 State of Texas Assessments of Academic Readiness (STAAR) results, 82% of students in Lipan ISD met Approaches Grade Level standards, compared with 79% in Region 11 and 78% in the state of Texas. The average SAT score of the students tested in 2017-18 was 1076, and average ACT score was not reported.

Demographics
In the 2018–2019 school year, the school district had a total of 435 students, ranging from pre-kindergarten through grade 12. The class of 2018 included 23 graduates; the annual drop-out rate across grades 9-12 was reported as 0.0%.

As of the 2018–2019 school year, the ethnic distribution of the school district was 84.1% White, 13.6% Hispanic, 0.7% American Indian, 0.2% African American, 0.2% Pacific Islander, and 1.1% from two or more races; no Asian students were reported. Economically disadvantaged students made up 48.7% of the student body, compared with 60.6% of all Texas students.

References

External links
Lipan ISD

School districts in Hood County, Texas
School districts in Erath County, Texas
School districts in Palo Pinto County, Texas
School districts in Parker County, Texas